Juan Edmundo Vecchi (June 23, 1931 – January 23, 2002) was a Catholic Roman Priest of the Salesians of Don Bosco, who was the 8th Rector Major of that order between March 20, 1996, until his death in 2002. He was the first non-Italian successor of Don Bosco and the first Argentinian to get such position. He was also the nephew of St Artémides Zatti.

Life 

He was born in Viedma, Rio Negro, Argentina, into a migrant family of the northern Italian Emilia-Romagna region in 1931. His parents were Albino Vecchi and Maria Monti, both born in Italy, migrated to Argentina at the end of the 19th century where they married. Juan Edmundo was the 7th and last child of Vecchi. He did his first studies at the Don Bosco Institute of Viedma where he decided to follow the religious life with the Salesians. In 1942 he joint the Fortín Mercedes Salesian College, so in 1948 he entered the novitiate. Vecchi made his Theology studies to become priest in Turin at the Crocetta Salesian Theologate in 1954 and was ordained in 1958.

Vecchi started his apostolate in Fortín Mercedes between 1958 and 1960 as Catechist of the Salesian Aspirantate, then director of the Bahía Blanca's Dominic Savio College between 1962 and 1970. The Rector Major, Luis Ricceri, elected Vecchi as Regional Superior for the Salesian works of Argentina, Brasil, Uruguay and Paraguay until 1977, then he became World Councilor for the Youth Ministry in Rome until 1990. He became Vicar of the Rector Major Egidio Viganò until 1995, when Viganò died and a new General Chapter elected a new Rector Major.

Rector Major 

The 24th General Chapter of the Salesians of Don Bosco of 1996 elected Juan Edmundo Vecchi as the 8th successor of Don Bosco on March 20. He was always remembered for his dedication to the youth ministry, Salesian spirituality and a dedicated writer. The same as Fr. Viganò, Vecchi ended his period as Rector Major at the sickbed, but he made that special moment of his life a reason of reflection and spirituality writing more documents about the Salesian mission. He died on January 23, 2002, and was buried at the Catacomb of Callixtus that are under the care of the Salesians.

During his period as Rector Major, Vecchi saw the beatification of his uncle, Artémides Zatti, although he died in Rome a few weeks before Pope John Paul II presided over the celebration of that event on April 14, 2002. Zatti was a Lay Salesian and he was also beatified with another Salesian Brother: Simon Srugi. He gave also a deep sense to the fact that he was the last Rector Major of the 20th century and the first of the 21st, sending several Salesian missioners around the world to open the new Millennium for the youth. He was succeeded by Mexican Pascual Chávez Villanueva.

Notes 

Argentine people of Italian descent
Salesians of Don Bosco
1931 births
20th-century Argentine Roman Catholic priests
2002 deaths
People from Viedma